Oin, Óin or OIN may refer to:

Folklore and fiction
 Óin, son of Gróin, a Dwarf from J. R. R. Tolkien's writings, companion of Thorin Oakenshield
 Oin-Oin, a character of Swiss folklore

Other
 Open Invention Network, a company specialising in patent with Linux
 Oneida Indian Nation, the New York tribe that operates Turning Stone Resort & Casino
 One language, specifically Inebu, by ISO 639-3 code

See also
 Eoin, an Irish name pronounced O-in